Amatlán Zapotec (Northeastern Miahuatlán Zapotec) is a Zapotec language spoken in southern Oaxaca, Mexico, in the municipalities of San Cristóbal Amatlán and San Francisco Logueche, in the district of Miahuatlán. Although the towns' residents speak different dialects, the dialects are mutually intelligible.

References

External links 
OLAC resources in and about the Amatlán Zapotec language

Amatlan Zapotec language resources

Zapotec languages
Languages of Mexico
Oto-Manguean languages